Common Courtesy is the fifth studio album by American rock band A Day to Remember. Songs for the album were written mid-2011, with recording starting from early-2012 and going into March 2013, with mixing being handled in the same month. In between that time period, an unmixed version of "Violence (Enough Is Enough)" was streamed from the band's website in December 2012. The band then embarked on the Right Back at It Again Tour in March 2013, performing the new song "Right Back at It Again" at each show. From mid-August to late-September, the band released webisodes to tie-in with the album. The band performed another song that would appear on the album, "Dead & Buried", at each stop of the following House Party Tour, beginning in September 2013 and ending a month later.

A few months before the recording of the album started, in December 2011, the band was involved in a lawsuit with their label Victory, which had parts resolved a few days before the album's release. This lawsuit led to the band's initial digital self-release of the album on October 8, with a physical release following on November 25, featuring three bonus tracks. Common Courtesy charted at number 34 in the UK and number 37 in the U.S. and was met with critical acclaim, with critics praising the album's sound. "Right Back at It Again" charted at number 33 on the Alternative Songs and at number 40 on the Mainstream Rock Songs charts in the U.S, while "End of Me" charted at number 40 on Alternative Songs and at number 26 on Mainstream Rock Songs.

Background
Shortly after the end of Warped Tour in July 2011, the band decided to take a break to compose new material. In an interview with Alternative Press in November, vocalist Jeremy McKinnon said that after the band's done touring Europe the group will be recording their next album. McKinnon also said that he has "been writing constantly for the course of the two years" while the band has been touring, and he is "really happy" with the material accumulated up to this point.

On December 15, it was announced that A Day to Remember had plans of pressing charges against their label, Victory, due to breach of contract. Claiming withheld royalties of over $75,000, the group had reportedly started legal action against Victory on May 31 of that year. Victory has said, on their behalf, that the lawsuit is actually about the band's refusal to fulfill their 5 album contractual commitment to Victory and their new-found desire to move to a major label. A Day to Remember gave Altpress.com a statement: "A Day To Remember would like to make it clear that they did not announce nor seek any attention regarding their ongoing suit with Victory Records. This information has been public record since May of 2011 and they have no intention of speaking publicly or disparagingly regarding their disagreement with Victory. A Day To Remember will continue to release music for their fans".

Recording

In January 2012, guitarist Kevin Skaff said the band would be recording after they had finished touring in early May and that it would "hopefully [...] be done by July or August" with the album out during the same year. On April 4, McKinnon hinted via Twitter that the band might be recording. On May 10, the band said live on stage that the band's new album would be titled Common Courtesy. Shortly after this, the band started recording for the new album, on the 14th. On August 25, Skaff had confirmed the album's title. In September, the band said that they were working with Chad Gilbert. While in the middle of recording Common Courtesy, the band played a home town gig on November 21.

A video counting down from the number 21 was posted online in early December; in the video McKinnon stated that "this is some of the best material that we've written. I know people say that every album but I know it is." Some thought this was a countdown to the album, instead, on December 21, the band released the track "Violence (Enough Is Enough)" on their website, which was confirmed to appear on Common Courtesy. McKinnon said that the music video was supposed to be filmed and released for "Violence (Enough Is Enough)" on the same day "but it just didn't turn out that way. [...] We're trying to get things done as fast as possible, but it just hasn't been working out." Despite a statement on October 17, 2012 by producer Gilbert stating that the album might be finished within a week, by the time "Violence (Enough Is Enough)" was released, the album was only partly recorded.

In an interview with Jennifer J. Walker of Kerrang! magazine, McKinnon stated that there would be five heavy songs appearing on the album. McKinnon said the album would be a "reflection on our history, on how small-town kids playing music that doesn't really make sense to the world ended up on the main stages of some of the biggest music festivals around the world." McKinnon confirmed that the opening track would be "City of Ocala". McKinnon said via a tweet, posted on February 18, 2013 that the band were still working on the album. In a February interview with radio.com, McKinnon said the delay in releasing material was not due to the band's lawsuit against their record label, Victory, but down to the number of songs for the album, and that the band were still "working that out". The band had recorded an amount of material equal to that of "literally three or four albums' worth", McKinnon said "If you're putting out 15-plus tracks on a record, that could be dangerous. It's hard for even your biggest fans to stay with you that long."

McKinnon mentioned that the band had financed the recording themselves and been recording at McKinnon's home studio, built specifically for the making of this album. The recording studio cost $40,000 (£25,000) for McKinnon and producer Andrew Wade to build; the rest of the band members paying $20,000 of the total. Dan Korneff helped build various equipment for the studio, such as several audio compressors. Wade and Korneff had a trial and error system based on what Wade liked and disliked in a studio, which as McKinnon commented, "[we] built the whole studio around that [...] It took us a few months to get up and running". Mastering was handled by Ted Jensen at Sterling Sound, and mixing by Ken Andrews.

The band's original guitarist, Tom Denney, was present for and had played a part in the recording: "He was just like another member of our band like he used to be. This is gonna be a really special album because of it." In the February 2013 issue of Alternative Press magazine, McKinnon said the band had a total of 40 songs to work with: "There was just this wave of songwriting that happened in the last year... We have so much stuff that it's just a completely different experience. [...] We've never had this much of it, and it's never been this good right from the start." A month later, on 19 March, McKinnon said recording for the album had been finished, and now the album was onto the mixing stage. On the same day, the band's video editor, Drew Russ, post a tweet saying he had "Wrapped up everything for the @WhereisADTR Common Courtesy episodes." The next day, McKinnon again had an interview with radio.com, McKinnon said the band "always put one of the best heavy songs out first", then following-up with "with a more well-rounded song that appeals to everybody."

Music and lyrics

Style and influences
In an interview with magazine NME at the same time, McKinnon said that despite having much material "We've not been able to get down to putting it all together yet", then reassuring that "when that happens we'll really be ready to go." When asked what his inspiration has been, McKinnon replied that its "new stuff I'm listening to all the time, I listen to a bit of everything", then going on to name a few artists that he admires: Mumford & Sons, Living with Lions and Coldplay, among others. McKinnon was then asked whether or not those bands' sound might influence the album, McKinnon answered with "Maybe, I guess I'll find out when we go through all the new ones", but then going on to say "Everything influences me, but it'll be an A Day To Remember record." McKinnon went on to say that Common Courtesy is going to "have more heavier songs than on the past two records together. But with A Day To Remember, it's not that simple because A Day To Remember isn't one band." Featured on multiple songs is in-studio banter, which Gregory Heaney calls "a window into a creative process that sounds fun and relaxed".

Tracks
McKinnon, along with Denney and Wade, wrote "the biggest songs on the album" in a period of five days. "City of Ocala" is "about standing in the back garden of my parents' house and looking in the garage where we started, where we'd practice, and where we'd terrorise the neighbourhood." It is also about the band's hometown, Ocala, Florida, as McKinnon commented: "we've tended to be a little bit negative about Ocala, but as time goes on we've learned to appreciate it more." "Right Back at It Again" was almost excluded from the album as it was one of the excess songs the band had recorded, "we realised that it sounded great, so on it went." "Sometimes You're the Hammer, Sometimes You're the Nail" was the last song written for the album, the band wasn't pleased with the second verse and thus was re-written four times until the band thought it was satisfactory. "Dead & Buried" was a "song that just came together" with minimal adjustments needed to it. "Best of Me" had, according to McKinnon, a Foo Fighters feel to it. It is one of the few songs of the band that does not credit McKinnon as a writer of the song's music. "I'm Already Gone" was written while the band was touring with Bring Me the Horizon in the UK while McKinnon was on the tour bus, "a long time ago". It was demoed acoustically a couple of years prior to the album; Skaff said it was more or less finished by that point bar an electric guitar idea, which had come from  Wade, that was added.

"Violence (Enough Is Enough)" was the first song written for inclusion on the album. Discussing "Violence (Enough Is Enough)" in an interview, McKinnon said that the song was "about different perspectives from the world and why people do terrible things to each other." "Life @ 11" had come about during the pre-production stage of the album: "a lot of preproduction for this album, and this song kind of fell out of thin air." "I Surrender" was written "three or four years ago", however, McKinnon didn't like the original version he wrote, "but I always really loved it" so he later "got it finished in the way that I wanted it to be". "Life Lessons Learned the Hard Way" was the last song written for the album: "We were like, 'Man we need something heavy!' This song actually came from a voice memo that I'd recorded." "End of Me" came about from McKinnon and Wade messing around in the studio with an acoustic guitar: "the song just came from something that he [Wade] played on that I thought was so awesome that the vocal line came more or less immediately came to me." "The Document Speaks for Itself" was the first song recorded for the album, it is about the band's lawsuit with Victory. An early edit of the song surfaced online on October 8, it features an intro consisting of a voicemail left by Victory-owner Tony Brummel saying he would sue the band. "I Remember" is a "collection of memories [...] about our whole time on the road and some of the crazy things that happened to us over the years".

Release

Right Back at It Again Tour and delayed release
On January 21, 2013, the band announced they would go on the Right Back at It Again Tour, which started on March 20 and lasted until May 4. On May 17, the tour would be extended to include dates in Australia in July.

Asked about a release date for the album in an interview with WGRD in April 2013, McKinnon said that "there's a date we've been–that I've heard–tossed around in the last week, but I mean we haven't really set anything in stone. But it's gonna be as soon as we possibly can. We're doing our best, we're just trying–you know–we took our time to really make this record as good as it could be, in our eyes [...] If everybody could be patient with us, I think they will be very very happy with what we put out." Asked if the album was going to be released on Victory, McKinnon replied that the band were "not sure", and that the lawsuit was still being settled. Replying to fan via Twitter on 22 July, McKinnon said the album was "still being mixed".

Eventual release and promotion
[[File:Cc webseries.jpg|thumbnail|right|A promotional ad for the ''Common Courtesy 'The Series web series.]]
On August 16, 2013, the band's official Facebook page announced Common Courtesy 'The Series, a web series that were released on YouTube. The first episode, titled "Black Crow", was released on August 23. The next day, Common Courtesy was announced for release on October 8. The second episode, "Golden Eagle", was released on August 30; featured in the episode is a rap song of the same name, which had a music video released for it on September 4. The song was a spin on Trinidad James’ song “All Gold Everything”. The third episode, titled "Guitar Vibes" and released on September 6, was a joke on how the band was taking their time on recording the album. On September 11, the band began the House Party Tour, where new song "Dead & Buried" was played on the first night. The fourth episode, "Spiritual Uplifting", was released September 15; the final episode, "The Finale", was released on September 23, as was the cover art for the album, and digital pre-orders were being taken.

In an Alternative Press interview posted on September 10, asked whether or not the album would be self-released, McKinnon replied "I'll be honest with you, I don't really know. I see [...] people are saying, "Oh, this is going to ruin their career [...]" etc. How about this: I'm not going to allow someone to sit on my career and ruin what may be our best album for people." The album was finished "As of last week, we got the final master. I was telling people forever that the record wasn't finished, wasn't mastered and wasn't mixed. It's finally done." McKinnon also said the album would be pressed "pretty soon" and that the band was "doing it ourselves"; further adding that "We don't care if we have to put out an album the day of October 8 and it's only available digitally." It was revealed by McKinnon that the version of "Violence (Enough Is Enough)" that was posted back in December wasn't mixed and that the lawsuit was still ongoing. On October 4, it was announced the band had won against Victory in the court case, the group, however, is still contractually obligated to owe the label at least two more albums.

Victory uploaded a video to YouTube called "The End begins October 8th 2013"; some thought this was a reference to the lawsuit with the band (however it was later revealed to just be a teaser for a new song from the band Close Your Eyes). "Right Back at It Again" was announced on October 7 to be broadcast as part of BBC Radio 1's Rock Show the following midnight, with the band calling the song their "brand new single". Common Courtesy was self-released by the band on October 8 digitally. On October 17, the band announced the physical and iTunes releases would occur on November 25, with three additional tracks: "Leave All the Lights On", "Good Things", and "Same Book But Never the Same Page". "Right Back at It Again" impacted radio on November 11. McKinnon, guitarist Neil Westfall and Skaff performed a surprise acoustic show for Warped Tour 2013 UK on November 17, and another acoustic set, this time at Banquet Records the following day, both in London. Skaff said, in an interview on November 24, that the band were "practicing for a little acoustic, week long radio promotion" throughout London and Germany, and with the U.S. radio stations in December.

Physical editions were released on November 25 in the U.S. and Europe by the band's own label, ADTR Records, and in Australia in cooperation with 3Wise Records on November 29. In early December, it was revealed the album had sold 92,874 copies in the U.S. within first week of release: 40,550 copies from the digital release, and 52,324 from the physical release. The band performed "Right Back at It Again" and "City of Ocala" acoustically for Billboard. The band went on a UK and Europe Tour in January and February 2014. A "marble coloured" vinyl edition was released in the UK on February 10. On March 25, "End of Me" was released as a radio single. In September, the band performed at Chill on the Hill festival. On March 9, 2015, a music video was released for "City Of Ocala".

Critical reception

Before release, the album had been widely anticipated. Recalling the band's fans response to "Violence (Enough Is Enough)", McKinnon said "it was one of the best responses we've ever had coming out of the gate. I can't tell you how excited that made all of us." The album received a Metacritic aggregate score of 80. AbsolutePunk reviewer Thomas Nassiff summarizes that McKinnon "chronicle[d] the last three years of his band's collective life", from the opening track to the last song "often reminisc[ing] on the band's beginnings". Another recurring matter was "demanding respect", and that the band "doesn't stray" from their combination of pop punk and metalcore. Writing for Alternative Press, Brendan Manley called the album "a classic ADTR record in every sense", with Manley favoring the pop punk songs: "[pop punk] wins, providing the most memorable moments on the record". Manley noted the listener would hear constant "touches of the unmistakable chug-a-chug algorithm ADTR" that the band had previously used on their other albums.

Tamsyn Wilce, for Alter the Press!, wrote that the album's opening track "throw[s] you right into the whirlpool of pop-mosh goodness" proving that the band "returned with a massive bunch of solid anthems". Wilce also wrote that the songs "make up" for the amount of in-studio chatter included on the album. Rock Sounds Andy Ritchie called "Right Back at It Again" "unmistakably the 'All I Want' of 'Common Courtesy'" and suggesting that lines in "Sometimes You're the Hammer, Sometimes You're the Nail", and "The Document Speaks for Itself", were digs at Victory. Ritchie also wrote that "the pace is broken up" by "I'm Already Gone" which was "well-aligned" slotted before "Violence (Enough Is Enough)".

Commercial performance and accolades
Due to the way in which the album was released it was ineligible to chart within its first week of release on the Billboard 200, however, it was predicted that had it been eligible, it would've debuted in the Top 10 as it sold over 92,000 copies in the United States. It eventually debuted at number 47 on Billboard 200 and peaked at number 37 three weeks later. The album has sold 270,000 copies in the United States as of July 2016.

The album had debuted on the UK album chart at number 57, and on the UK Rock & Metal Albums Chart at number 1. The album also charted at number 40 in Austria and at number 48 in Germany. "Right Back at It Again" peaked at number 33 on the Alternative Songs chart and at number 40 on the Mainstream Rock Songs chart. The album was placed at number 4 on Rock Sounds "The 50 Best Albums Of 2013" list. The music video for "Right Back at It Again" was nominated for Best Video at the Kerrang! Awards.

Track listing
All lyrics written by Jeremy McKinnon.Physical edition bonus DVD – Common Courtesy – The Series
"Black Crow" – 7:27
"Guitar Vibes" – 8:00
"Spiritual Uplifting" – 7:34
"The Finale" – 7:29

Personnel
Personnel per digital booklet.A Day to RememberJeremy McKinnon – lead vocals
Josh Woodard – bass guitar
Neil Westfall – rhythm guitar, backing vocals
Alex Shelnutt – drums
Kevin Skaff – lead guitar, backing vocalsProductionJeremy McKinnon, Andrew Wade, Chad Gilbert – producers
Andrew Wade – engineer
Ken Andrews – mixing
Ted Jensen – mastering
Jeremy McKinnon – art direction
Tony Moore – front cover illustration
Mike Cortada – back cover, album booklet and booklet illustration
Adam Elmakias – photos
Micah Bell – card & CC logo

Charts

Weekly charts

Year-end charts

ReferencesFootnotesCitationsSources'''

Further reading

External links
"Violence (Enough Is Enough)" song review at Mind Equals Blown.
Official Common Courtesy stream at YouTube.

A Day to Remember albums
2013 albums
Albums produced by Jeremy McKinnon
Albums produced by Andrew Wade
Albums produced by Chad Gilbert
Self-released albums